Terao Dam is an earthfill dam located in Toyama prefecture in Japan. The dam is used for flood control. The catchment area of the dam is 6 km2. The dam impounds about 5  ha of land when full and can store 543 thousand cubic meters of water. The construction of the dam was started on 1967 and completed in 1973.

References

Dams in Toyama Prefecture
1973 establishments in Japan